Enschede is the main railway station in Enschede, Netherlands. The station opened on 1 July 1866 and is on the Zutphen–Glanerbeek railway. Between the late 1970s and 2001, the passenger service to Germany stopped. The connection to Münster was reopened in 2001.  There is no connection allowing the German trains to run any further into Overijssel; however there was before the line closed.

From summer 2013 to summer 2014 the station is being largely modernised. The station was closed between 6 July and 18 August 2013, in which all the rails and overhead wires were replaced at the station. Platforms 1 and 2 were extended; platform 5 was closed. Platform 4 has been split in two, one part for the trains to Germany and the other part for the Sprinters. The two lines are still not connected. The sidings for stabling trains were also replaced and points replaced to reduce the noise made as trains pass over them.

History 
On July 1, 1866, Enschede got a station on the Zutphen–Glanerbeek railway line. The station building was the Staatsspoor new type 3rd class design. Also Hengelo had such a station from 1866 to 1899. The current stations of Meppel (1865) and Station Zuidbroek (1865) also follow the same design.

The present building was designed after the Second World War and opened in 1950. The architect H.G.J. Schelling (1888-1978) designed the station to be a combination of both a through station and a terminus. It quickly lost its status as a through station for the Netherlands rail network when the Twente S-bahn was opened in 1956 and the Deutsche Bahn terminated its services between Gronau and Enschede. Two small street platforms were built for the S-bahn trains that were street running through the Prinsessetunnel.

2000 saw some significant structural alterations. The sidesteps were removed, and a new entrance was built in the centre of the entrance hall. The tracks of the Alenol Line in the Prinsessetunnel were also removed, and works on the Noordertunnel started. The new platforms for the Alenol Line were opened in 2002, together with the new platforms for the Ehebo Line in the Lonnekerboog, which was also moved underground.

The latest service addition to the station came on 18 November 2001, when DB Regio reopened the train service to Gronau and Münster/Dortmund. These trains departed from a newly constructed platform, located along the southern side of the newly constructed rail line and directly connected with the station square and platforms 4a and 4b. As the Dutch and German rail lines use different rail safety systems, the tracks do not at any point physically connect. As such, for train services Enschede effectively became a "double terminus".

Train services
, the following train services call at this station:

Bus services

Many bus services depart from the bus station in front of the station, many carrying a red Twents livery, for the Twente region (Eastern Overijssel).

1 - Wesselerbrink - Boswinkel - Station NS - Twekkelerveld - Twente University
2 - Helmerhoek - Station NS - Roombeek - Deppenbroek - Bolhaar
3 - Station NS - Wooldrik - Esmarke - Glanerbrug
4 - Stroinkslanden - Station NS - 't Zwering
5 - 't Zwering - Station NS - Hogeland
6 - Stokhorst - Laares - Station NS - Transportcentrum - Boekelo
8 - Hengelo Station - Hengelo, IKEA - Hengelo, Vossenbelt - Hengelo, Hasseler Es - Hengelo, Groot Driene - Twente University - Enschede Station NS - Van Heekplein - Wesselerbrink - Transportcentrum - Hengelo Station
9 - Hengelo - Twente University - Enschede
60 - Enschede - Oldenzaal
61 - Enschede - Losser - Overdinkel
62 - Borculo - Neede - Haaksbergen - Enschede - Oldenzaal - Denekamp
73 - Enschede - Haaksbergen - Groenlo - Winterswijk
74 - Enschede - Haaksbergen - Groenlo - Doetinchem

Gallery

References

External links
NS website 
Dutch Public Transport journey planner 

Railway stations in Overijssel
Railway stations opened in 1866
Railway stations on the Staatslijn D
1866 establishments in the Netherlands
Buildings and structures in Enschede
Railway stations in the Netherlands opened in the 19th century